Chalcolecta is a spider genus of the jumping spider family, Salticidae.

This genus is close to Diolenius.

Species
, the World Spider Catalog accepted the following species:
 Chalcolecta bitaeniata Simon, 1884 – Moluccas, Sulawesi
 Chalcolecta dimidiata Simon, 1884 – Moluccas
 Chalcolecta prensitans (Thorell, 1881) – New Guinea, Queensland

Salticus amplectens Doleschall, 1859 and Salticus zostifera Doleschall, 1859 were included in Chalcolecta by Joanna Gardzińska and Marek Żabka in 2005, as nomina dubia (doubtful names), since the original type specimens have been lost. , the World Spider Catalog agreed on the status of nomina dubia, but considered the placement in Chalcolecta as an error ("lapsus").

References

External links
 Photographs of C. prensitans

Salticidae
Salticidae genera
Spiders of Asia
Spiders of Australia